Splatt is a small settlement in north Cornwall, England, United Kingdom at . It is situated between Pityme and Rock although the buildings along the Rock Road are continuous.

It should not be confused with Splatt in the parish of Tresmeer.

References

External links

Hamlets in Cornwall